Joel Anderson is a supervisor-elect of the San Diego County Board of Supervisors. He previously served as a California state senator, assemblyperson, and board member of a municipal water district.

California State Assembly elections

1998

2006

2008

Padre Dam Municipal Water District election (2002)

California State Senate elections

2010

2014

California State Board of Equalization election (2018)

San Diego County Republican Party central committee election (2020)

San Diego County Board of Supervisors election (2020)

References

Electoral history of politicians from California